Thomas Kent Jr. Farm is a historic home and farm located at Franklin Township in Greene County, Pennsylvania. The house was built about 1851, and is a -story, brick dwelling with a 2-story rear ell in the Greek Revival style.  It measures 43 feet by 36 feet.  Also on the property are the contributing frame barn (c. 1850), corn crib (c. 1850), shed (c. 1920), two car garage (c. 1928), and pond (c. 1928).

It was listed on the National Register of Historic Places in 2000.

References 

Farms on the National Register of Historic Places in Pennsylvania
Houses on the National Register of Historic Places in Pennsylvania
Greek Revival houses in Pennsylvania
Houses completed in 1851
Houses in Greene County, Pennsylvania
1851 establishments in Pennsylvania
National Register of Historic Places in Greene County, Pennsylvania